Color code or color coding may refer to:

Color code, standardized mappings from systems of colors to meanings, as in traffic lights
Color coding technology for visualization, methods of choosing meanings for colors in information visualization
Color-coding, a technique for speeding up pattern matching algorithms by randomly assigning colors to objects
Color-code (band), a Japanese all-female music group
Colour Coding, an  Australian indie pop band
Color Code Personality Profile, a classification of people's motivations into four types associated with four colors
Color-coding, formally called Unified Vehicular Volume Reduction Program, a system restricting when cars can drive in Metro Manila
Gender color-coding, the stereotyped association of color with gender in some cultures
Electronic color code, the color code used to identify electronic parts
Web colors, defined with a hexadecimal triplet code

See also 
 Coloring (disambiguation)
 Blue code
 Code Red (disambiguation)
 Gold code
 Gray code